Mario Morra (born 1935) is an Italian film editor, director and screenwriter.

Born in Rome, Morra began working as an assistant editor in the early 1960s, and made his debut as film editor in 1964. He gradually established himself up as one of the most representative of his profession, very active in art films as well as in less ambitious works. In 1990 he was nominated to BAFTA Award for Best Editing for Giuseppe Tornatore's Cinema Paradiso.

In the 1970s and 1980s, Morra was also director or writer of several successful documentaries and Mondo films, often in collaboration with Antonio Climati like Turbo Time a documentary about the world of car and motorcycle racing..

Selected filmography
 Red Roses for the Fuhrer (1968)

References

External links

1935 births
Italian film editors
Writers from Rome
Italian screenwriters
Italian male screenwriters
Italian film directors
Living people